The 2005 Samoa rugby union tour of Australia and New Zealand was a series of matches played in June 2005 in Australia and New Zealand by the Samoa national rugby union team.
It was a very experimental team, with nine debuts in an international test.

Results

Week 1
The Samoans won their opening mid-week tour match against New South Wales Country before being thrashed by the Wallabies in Sydney.

Week 2
Samoa completed their short tour of Australia with a 40–25 loss to the Northern Territory Mosquitoes in Darwin, before travelling home via New Zealand, where they were defeated by North Harbour.

References

2005 rugby union tours
2005
Rugby union
2005 in Oceanian rugby union
2005 in Australian rugby union
2005 in New Zealand rugby union
2005
2005